Megalibgwilia is a genus of echidna known only from Australian fossils that incorporates the oldest-known echidna species.  The genus ranged from the Miocene until the late Pleistocene, becoming extinct about 50,000 years ago. Megalibgwilia species were more widespread in warmer and moist climates. The extinction can be attributed to increasing aridification in Southern Australia.

Megalibgwilia was first described from a broken left humerus by Richard Owen in 1884, as "Echidna" ramsayi. Complete skulls and postcranial fossils have since been described. A second species, M. robusta, was described in 1896 by Australian paleontologist William Sutherland Dun. Megalibgwilia comes from Greek mégas (μέγᾰς)  and Wemba Wemba libgwil (plus the Latin suffix -ia), meaning echidna.

Although they are sometimes commonly referred to as giant echidnas, Megalibgwilia species are thought to have been similar in size to the contemporary western long-beaked echidna, but with slightly longer forearms. They were smaller than a large species known from fossils in Australia, Murrayglossus. M. ramsayi fossils have been found in deposits across mainland Australia and on Tasmania. M. robusta has only been found in New South Wales. Megalibgwilia was probably an insect-eater, like the short-beaked echidna, rather than a worm-eater like members of Zaglossus.

M. robusta is the oldest-known echidna and the only known Miocene species.

References

External links
 
 
 Extinct Animals : Megalibgwilia ramsayi - Reconstructions and skull images from Parks and Wildlife, South Australia

Prehistoric monotremes
Miocene mammals of Australia
Pliocene mammals
Pleistocene mammals
Prehistoric mammal genera
Fossil taxa described in 1884